Gathering and Stitching machines or Saddle-Stitcher are printing postpress machines used to collate and stitch multiple signatures.  The machine then cuts the stapled signatures so that the booklets may be opened.

Numerous companies produce Saddle-Stitchers, among them Heidelberger and Muller Martini.

References

Bookbinding